"Regret" is the 13th single by Japanese singer Mai Hoshimura, released on June 4, 2008, on the SMEJ label. The title track was used as the seventh ending theme for the anime series D.Gray-man. The single peaked at number 30 and charted for four weeks in the Oricon charts. The coupling "Sakura Biyori x Kotaro Oshio" is an acoustic version of her previous-released song "Sakura Biyori".

This single's catalog number is SECL-643.

Track listing 

"Regret"
Composition/Lyrics: Mai Hoshimura
Arrangement: Hideyuki Daichi Suzuki
"Love Tuning"
Composition/Lyrics: Mai Hoshimura
Arrangement:  SatoriShiraishi
"Sakura Biyori x Kotaro Oshio"
Composition/Lyrics: Mai Hoshimura
Arrangement: Kotaro Oshio
"Regret (D.Gray-man Ending ver.)"
"Regret" (instrumental)

References

2008 singles
Mai Hoshimura songs
SME Records singles
2008 songs